Wilhelm Theodor Nocken (1830, Düsseldorf - 1905, Düsseldorf) was a German landscape painter of the Düsseldorf school of painting.

Life and work 
Three years later, he took a construction class at the Kunstakademie Düsseldorf, taught by Rudolf Wiegmann. The following year, seeking to become a professional artist, he received elementary painting instruction there. Finally, from 1847 to 1805, he studied landscape painting with Johann Wilhelm Schirmer. He had to leave during the third quarter of his last year to perform his military service.

He eventually settled in Düsseldorf and became a landscape painter. His favorite locations were in the Alps of Austria and Bavaria; which he depicted in a romantic and idyllic style. He rarely painted in the Rheinland or Westphalia; areas which were popular with other landscape artists.

References

Further reading 
 "Nocken, Wilhelm Theodor". In: Friedrich von Boetticher: Malerwerke des neunzehnten Jahrhunderts. Beitrag zur Kunstgeschichte. Dresden 1898, Vol. 2, pg. 156.
 "Zum Beispiel Theodor Wilhelm Nocken". In: Christoph Dautermann: Alpenbegeisterung im Spiegel der Malerei des 19. Jahrhunderts. Michael Imhof Verlag, Petersberg 2016,

External links 

 More works by Nocken @ ArtNet.


1830 births
1905 deaths
German landscape painters
Artists from Düsseldorf
Düsseldorf school of painting